Cyberstrategy 3.0 is the United States information warfare strategy against cyberwarfare. This strategy uses deterrence based on making infrastructure robust and redundant enough to survive any Internet cyber attack. 
A good example of this concept can be seen in action in a cyber strategy game like CyberStratG. 

.

References

Cyberwarfare in the United States
Electronic warfare
Hacking (computer security)
Military technology